The 14th National Congress of the People's Party was held in Madrid from 25 to 27 January 2002, to renovate the governing bodies of the People's Party (PP) and establish the party's main lines of action and strategy for the next leadership term. It saw José María Aznar being re-elected unopposed for a fifth term as party president, with 99.6% of the delegate vote in the congress (2,528 votes) and 0.4% of blank ballots (10).

Candidates

Declined
The individuals in this section were the subject of speculation about their possible candidacy, but publicly denied or recanted interest in running:

Javier Arenas (age ) — Deputy in the Cortes Generales for Seville (1989–1994 and since 2000); Secretary-General of the PP (since 1999); Minister of Labour and Social Affairs of Spain (1996–1999); President of the PP of Andalusia (1993–1999); Senator in the Cortes Generales appointed by the Parliament of Andalusia (1994–1996); Deputy in the Parliament of Andalusia for Seville (1986–1989 and 1994–1996).
Alberto Ruiz-Gallardón (age ) — President of the Community of Madrid (since 1995); Deputy in the Assembly of Madrid (since 1987); Spokesperson of the PP Group in the Senate of Spain (1993–1995); Senator in the Cortes Generales appointed by the Assembly of Madrid (1987–1995); Spokesperson of the AP/PP Group in the Assembly of Madrid (1987–1993); Vice President of AP (1987–1989); Secretary-General of AP (1986–1987); City Councillor of Madrid (1983–1987).
Jaime Mayor Oreja (age ) — Deputy in the Basque Parliament for Álava, Biscay and Gipuzkoa (1980, 1984–1986, 1990–1996 and since 2001); Vice Secretary-General of the PP (since 1996); Deputy in the Cortes Generales for Álava, Biscay and Gipuzkoa (1982, 1989–1990 and 1996–2001); Minister of the Interior of Spain (1996–2001); Spokesperson of the PP Group in the Basque Parliament (1990–1996); President of the PP of the Basque Country (1989–1996); Government's Delegate in the Basque Country (1982–1983); Minister of Industry, Tourism and Trade of the Basque Country (1979–1980).
Mariano Rajoy (age ) — Minister of the Interior of Spain (since 2001); First Deputy Prime Minister of Spain (since 2000); Vice Secretary-General of the PP (since 1990); Deputy in the Cortes Generales for Pontevedra and Madrid (1986 and since 1989); Minister of the Presidency of Spain (2000–2001); Minister of Education and Culture of Spain (1999–2000); Minister of Public Administrations of Spain (1996–1999); President of AP/PP in Pontevedra (1983–1986 and 1987–1991); Vice President of the Xunta de Galicia (1986–1987); President of the Provincial Deputation of Pontevedra (1983–1986); City Councillor of Pontevedra (1983–1986); Deputy in the Parliament of Galicia for Pontevedra (1981–1985); Director-General of Institutional Relations of Galicia (1982).
Rodrigo Rato (age ) — Second Deputy Prime Minister for Economic Affairs of Spain (since 2000); Minister of Economy of Spain (since 2000); Vice Secretary-General of the PP (since 1996); Deputy in the Cortes Generales for Cádiz and Madrid (since 1982); Second Deputy Prime Minister of Spain (1996–2000); Minister of Economy and Finance of Spain (1996–2000); Spokesperson of the PP Group in the Congress of Deputies (1989–1996).

Opinion polls
Poll results are listed in the tables below in reverse chronological order, showing the most recent first, and using the date the survey's fieldwork was done, as opposed to the date of publication. If such date is unknown, the date of publication is given instead. The highest percentage figure in each polling survey is displayed in bold, and the background shaded in the candidate's colour. In the instance of a tie, the figures with the highest percentages are shaded.

PP voters

Spanish voters

Results

References
Opinion poll sources

Other

Political party assemblies in Spain
People's Party (Spain)
Political party leadership elections in Spain
2002 conferences